Esmeralda Talamantez Mendoza is a Tejano singer who had a string of musical hits during the mid to late 1990s with her band Viento Loco.

Biography
Esmi"Ezmi" Talamantez was born and raised in Pecos, Texas with her brothers Ray Jr. and Abel and sisters Maria and Ramona. She attended the University of Texas at El Paso and then transferred to Corpus Christi, Texas to study business management and biology. Aspiring to excel in artist management, songwriting, and publishing, Esmi's clear cut voice was noticed by Fonovisa, and she was encouraged to unveil her hidden talents. Esmi's brother Ray Talamantez co-produced the debut album Esmi Talamantez along with former La Sombra guitarist Adam Vargas who wrote her debut single, "Con el Tiempo", which hit the charts in Radio y Musica and Billboard Top 20 Latin hits. The second single "Viento Loco" would have the same name as the band formed by Esmi, Ray, Ramona, Maria, and Adam. Esmi's debut album caused a chain reaction of events such as a nomination for Rising Female Star, Most Promising Band, by the Tejano music industry, and was also invited by the Tejano Music Awards to present Male Vocalist Award for 1996. Moreover, Esmi was recognized as 1996 Best New Artist at the Hispanic Music Awards held in El Paso, Texas and also became spokesperson for Toys for Tots in that region.

Her second album Si Supieras, released in 1996, is a compilation of songs inspired by the love that she shared with Adam Vargas, with songs such as "Todo Mi Amor" which samples Led Zeppelin's "All of my Love." Later that year, Esmi was invited by the American GI Forum to perform in the Cinco de Mayo Festival in San Diego, California. Esmi performed alongside international acts such as Ricky Martin, Thalía, Spanish Fly, Nu Flavor, and many others.

Her third album Alas De Un Sueño was released in 1997. With many of the songs written by Esmi and Adam Vargas, "Ojos de Serpiente" and "Vamos a Bailar" would be the leading singles.

Esmi Talamantez Y Viento Loco performed on many popular TV programs such as "The Johnny Canales Show", Puro Tejano, Tejano Country, Aqui Rogelio, "Siempre en Domingo," and the "Hora Lunatica" show in Mexico City, gaining national and international exposure. Esmi and Viento Loco would perform all throughout Texas as well as in Illinois, Michigan, Florida, Kansas, New Mexico, and California.

Living up to her family's musical legacy, Esmi's talent is derived from her past and present family members. Both of Esmi's grandfathers were musicians and song writers. Esmi's father, Ray Talamantez Sr., is an accomplished musician who has "jammed" with many great Tejano bands including Tortilla Factory, Brown Brandy, Little Joe Hernandez, and many others. Ray Talamantez Jr. is the former saxophone and trumpet player for La Sombra. Following in her footsteps, Esmi's sisters follow right along with their recognizable musical talents for playing saxophone, trumpet, and their outstanding harmonizing skills. Abel Talamantez, the youngest member of the family, has built his own reputation having performed with Menudo, the Kumbia Kings, and now Los Super Reyes.

Esmi and her band were greatly influenced by local and traditional music as well as Rock music of the 1970s and 80s, including bands such as Led Zeppelin, Queen, The Bee Gees, Fleetwood Mac, Prince, Styx, and Air Supply.

Discography

 1995: Esmi Talamantez (Fonovisa)
 1996: Si Supieras (Fonovisa)
 1997: Alas De Un Sueño (Fonovisa)

External links
 Esmi Talamantez Y Viento Loco Biography

American women singers
Living people
American musicians of Mexican descent
People from Pecos, Texas
Spanish-language singers of the United States
Singers from Texas
Year of birth missing (living people)
University of Texas at El Paso alumni
Hispanic and Latino American women singers
21st-century American women